Clathurella extenuata is a species of sea snail, a marine gastropod mollusk in the family Clathurellidae.

Description

Distribution
This species occurs in the Atlantic Ocean along Georgia, USA at a depth of 805 m.

References

extenuata